Stephan Puxkandl (born 8 April 1962) is an Austrian sailor. He competed in the Star event at the 1988 Summer Olympics.

References

External links
 

1962 births
Living people
Austrian male sailors (sport)
Olympic sailors of Austria
Sailors at the 1988 Summer Olympics – Star
Place of birth missing (living people)